Josh Rouse and the Long Vacations is the ninth studio album by American singer-songwriter Josh Rouse, released on September 27, 2011 on his own Bedroom Classics label.

Track listing

References

2011 albums
Josh Rouse albums